The following highways are numbered 958:

United States